Michigan eLibrary or Michigan electronic library (shortened as MeL), is an online library service of the state of Michigan for users of libraries in the state. It combines a group of participating libraries together in their efforts and resources.

There are about 430 participating libraries in the state of Michigan. The 49 million loanable items (books, DVDs, CDs, audiobooks) are centralized in one online catalog system called MelCat (Michigan electronic library catalog). Michigan eLibrary also has a set of practice exams that can be utilized to be able to get U.S. citizenship, civil service jobs, teaching jobs, law enforcement jobs, fire fighting jobs, real estate jobs, medical jobs, and a potential military career. There are also lessons and practice exams to learn Spanish and English as a second language. MeL also has a section geared to the entrepreneur that will furnish legal forms, demographic information, and mailing lists.

InterLibrary Loan (ILL) books 
MeLCat (Michigan electronic Library Catalog) is the state of Michigan inter-library loan program (ILL) of the participating Michigan libraries. The cataloged 49,346,993 items loaned between the libraries are books, DVDs, CDs, and audiobooks. They are transported between the libraries through the Regional Interlibrary Delivery Service (RIDES), a commercial van delivery service. There are about 90,000 items circulated between libraries each month at no cost to the library patron. There are over 60,000 delivery stops for library items done each year between the statewide libraries with each stop containing several items. During the fiscal year 2004-2005 there were about 20 million library items requested and delivered between Michigan libraries.

, MeLCat has fulfilled over 10 million requests for interlibrary loan items.

Library staff
Michigan eLibrary has a section on their website of step-by-step instructions and code for adding MeLCat search boxes and hyperlinked buttons to library websites. This section also has promotional materials for Mel and eLibrary. MeL Virtual Library Rooms that are designed to support virtual hybrid learning and new ways to engage library patrons and spotlight a local library's collections. These virtual library rooms are available to use by children and adults.

References

External links 

Library of Michigan homepage

Lansing, Michigan
Library consortia in Michigan
1995 establishments in Michigan